Ibn al-Qūṭiyya (died 6 November 977), born Muḥammad Ibn ʿUmar Ibn ʿAbd al-ʿAzīz ibn ʾIbrāhīm ibn ʿIsā ibn Muzāḥim, also known as Abu Bakr or al-Qurtubi ("the Córdoban"), was an Andalusian historian and the greatest philologist at the Umayyad court of caliph Al-Hakam II.  His magnum opus, the History of the Conquest of al-Andalus, is one of the earliest Arabic Muslim accounts of the Islamic conquest of Spain.

Life
Ibn al-Qūṭiyya, whose name means "son of the Gothic woman", claimed descent from Wittiza, the last king of the united Visigoths in Spain, through a granddaughter, Sara al-Qutiyya, who travelled to Damascus and married ʿĪsā ibn Muzāḥim, an Arab client of the 10th Umayyad caliph Hisham.  Sara and ʿĪsā  then returned to Al-Andalus.

Ibn al-Qūṭiyya was born and raised in Seville. His family was under the patronage of the Qurayshi tribe, and his father was a qāḍī (judge) in Seville and Écija. The Banu Hajjaj, also of Seville, were close relatives of his family, also claiming descent from Visigothic royalty. Ibn al-Qūṭiyya's student al-Faraḍī composed a short sketch of his master for his biographical dictionary, preserved in a late medieval manuscript discovered in Tunis in 1887.  Al-Faraḍī tells us Ibn al-Qūṭiyya studied first in Seville, then in Córdoba. Al-Faraḍī cautions that Qūṭiyya's histories were tales(akhbār), and not serious history(ta'rīkh). Under Saʿīd ibn Qāhir he studied, memorized and transmitted the great work of history known as Al-Kāmil  (The Complete) by the famous Baṣriyyan philologist, al-Mubarrad. He died in old age at Córdoba.

Al-Qūṭiyya's highly anecdotal history is unusual among the Arab chronicles.  The influence of his royal ancestry probably lies behind his defense of treaties between the Arab Muslim conquerors and the Gothic aristocracyboth secular and ecclesiastical that preserved them on their estates. Al-Qūṭiyya contests criticisms by historians such as Rhazes, arguing that these treaties bolstered Islamic hegemony at minimal military cost. He refutes a claim that the Umayyad emirs of Córdoba retained the fifth (quinto or khums, a tax) for the Caliph of Damascus. His history retells the legend of the part played by "the sons of Wittiza" at the Battle of Guadalete.


Works
Ta'rikh iftitāḥ al-Andalus, 'History of the Conquest of al-Andalus'; found in only a single extant manuscript, Bibliothèque Nationale de France No. 1867. Speculation about a  copy's existence among the rich manuscript collection at Constantine, Algeria, of Si Hamouda ben Cheikh el-Fakoun, seems unlikely according to recent scholarship.  The 18-volume history was written at the height of the Umayyad Caliphate of al-Andalus and  spans its first 250 years. Ibn al-Quṭīyya  treats of lives of Christians, Jews and Muslim converts, and in addition to accounts of  rulers are intrigues  among servants, minor officials, poets, judges, concubines and physicians.
Taʼrīj iftitāḥ al-Andalus, critical transcript of the unique manuscript edited by P. de Gayangos (with collaboration by E. Saavedra and F. Codera), 1868.
Historia de la conquista de España de Aben al-Cotia el cordobés, seguida de fragmentos históricos de Abencotaiba (y la noble carta dirigida a las comarcas españolas  del wazīr al-Gassānī), Spanish translation by Julián Ribera,  Madrid, 1926.
Early Islamic Spain: the History of Ibn al-Qūṭīya, English translation by David James, Routledge, 2009.
Kitāb Taṣārīf al-af’āl, ('Book on the Conjugation of Verbs')The oldest MS of an Arabic dictionary extant.
Kitāb al-Maqṣūr wa 'l-Mamdūd ('Book on the Shortened and Extended Alif').This title is mentioned by al-Faraḍī but no copy survives.

Notes

References

Bibliography

 
 
  
 
Nichols, James Manfield (1975). The History of the Conquest of Al-Andulus by Ibn al Qútiyya. PhD dissertation. University of North Carolina, Chapel Hill.

Further reading

             

977 deaths
10th-century biographers
10th-century historians from al-Andalus
10th-century philologists
10th-century lexicographers
10th-century non-fiction writers
10th-century Arabs
10th-century Visigothic people
Arab biographers
Arab grammarians
Arab lexicographers
Islamic Chroniclers
Medieval grammarians of Arabic
People from Córdoba, Spain
People from Seville
Philologists of Arabic
Scholars from the Caliphate of Córdoba
Visigothic people
Year of birth unknown
Muwallads